James Shepherd may refer to:

 James Shepherd (rugby league), Australian rugby league footballer
 James Shepherd (Australian cricketer) (1857–?), Australian cricketer
 James Shepherd (New Zealand cricketer) (1892–1970), New Zealand cricketer
 James E. Shepherd (1847–1910), lawyer and jurist who served on the North Carolina Supreme Court
 James Shepherd (biochemist) (born 1944), pioneer in the investigation of the causes, prevention and treatment of coronary heart disease
 James Shepherd (missionary) (1796–1882), Australian-born Wesleyan Christian missionary and settler in New Zealand
 James Shepherd (doctor) (1847–1926), physician and missionary

See also
Jim Shepherd (born 1940), Australian professional tennis player
James E. Shepard (1875–1947), American educator
James Sheppard (disambiguation)